Cephissus commonly spelled Kephissos or Kifisos ( or ; Ancient Greek: Κηφισός) is a river god of ancient Greece, associated with the river Cephissus in Attica and/or with the river Cephissus in Boeotia, both in Greece.

Family 
Cephissus was a son of Pontus and Thalassa. The daughters of Cephissus were (1) the naiad Lilaea, the eponym of Lilaea, (2) Daulis, the eponym of the city of Daulis and (3) Melaeno mother of Delphus by Apollo, though he also gives two other accounts of Delphus' mother. However, one of these alternate versions is that Thyia daughter of the aboriginal Castalius was Delphus' mother, almost certainly the same Thyia whom Herodotus claims was daughter of Cephissus to whom the Delphians built an altar to the winds and who was eponym of the Thyiades.

A mortal son of Cephissus was Eteocles by Euippe, daughter of Leucon, son of Athamas. This Euippe later on became the wife of King Andreus of Orchomenus and Eteocles inherited Andreus' throne. Eteocles or Eteoclus, son of Cephissus, was confirmed from Hesiod's and Pindar's accounts. He was the first made offering to the Charites by the side of the river Cephissus.

Cephissus was also said to be the father of Narcissus by the naiad Liriope. Another son, Euonoymus who gave his name to Euonymeia, was the father of Aulis, the eponym of Aulis.

Mythology 
This Cephisus may also be the Argive river-god of the same name who together with two other river-gods, Inachus and Asterion, judged that the land of Argolis to be belonged to Hera instead of Poseidon. Thus, the sea god made their waters disappear and for this reason neither of the three rivers provide water to the land except after rain. In an obscure myth, Cephissus greatly lamented his grandson being turned into a seal by Apollo.

Notes

References 
 Gaius Julius Hyginus, Fabulae from The Myths of Hyginus translated and edited by Mary Grant. University of Kansas Publications in Humanistic Studies. Online version at the Topos Text Project.
 Herodotus, The Histories with an English translation by A. D. Godley. Cambridge. Harvard University Press. 1920. . Online version at the Topos Text Project. Greek text available at Perseus Digital Library.
 Hesiod, Catalogue of Women from Homeric Hymns, Epic Cycle, Homerica translated by Evelyn-White, H G. Loeb Classical Library Volume 57. London: William Heinemann, 1914. Online version at theio.com
 Pausanias, Description of Greece with an English Translation by W.H.S. Jones, Litt.D., and H.A. Ormerod, M.A., in 4 Volumes. Cambridge, MA, Harvard University Press; London, William Heinemann Ltd. 1918. . Online version at the Perseus Digital Library
 Pausanias, Graeciae Descriptio. 3 vols. Leipzig, Teubner. 1903.  Greek text available at the Perseus Digital Library.
 Pindar, Odes translated by Diane Arnson Svarlien. 1990. Online version at the Perseus Digital Library.
 Pindar, The Odes of Pindar including the Principal Fragments with an Introduction and an English Translation by Sir John Sandys, Litt.D., FBA. Cambridge, MA., Harvard University Press; London, William Heinemann Ltd. 1937. Greek text available at the Perseus Digital Library.
 Publius Ovidius Naso, Metamorphoses translated by Brookes More (1859-1942). Boston, Cornhill Publishing Co. 1922. Online version at the Perseus Digital Library.
 Publius Ovidius Naso, Metamorphoses. Hugo Magnus. Gotha (Germany). Friedr. Andr. Perthes. 1892. Latin text available at the Perseus Digital Library.
 Publius Papinius Statius, The Thebaid translated by John Henry Mozley. Loeb Classical Library Volumes. Cambridge, MA, Harvard University Press; London, William Heinemann Ltd. 1928. Online version at the Topos Text Project.
 Publius Papinius Statius, The Thebaid. Vol I-II. John Henry Mozley. London: William Heinemann; New York: G.P. Putnam's Sons. 1928. Latin text available at the Perseus Digital Library.
 Smith, William. (1870). Dictionary of Greek and Roman Biography and Mythology. London: Taylor, Walton, and Maberly.
Stephanus of Byzantium, Stephani Byzantii Ethnicorum quae supersunt, edited by August Meineike (1790-1870), published 1849. A few entries from this important ancient handbook of place names have been translated by Brady Kiesling. Online version at the Topos Text Project.

Potamoi
Attican characters in Greek mythology
Boeotian characters in Greek mythology
Attic mythology
Boeotian mythology
Kourotrophoi
Metamorphoses into animals in Greek mythology